Aabhijathyam is a 1971 Indian Malayalam-language drama film directed by A. Vincent and produced by R. S. Prabhu. A remake of the Marathi film Manini (1961), it stars Madhu, Sharada, Sukumari and Kaviyoor Ponnamma. The was released on 12 August 1971. It was remade in Tamil as Petha Manam Pithu and in Telugu as Abhimanthavalu.

Plot 
Malathi who is born in a very wealthy family falls in love with her music teacher and gets married against the will of her father. Her husband is poor and her family looks down upon them. Once for her sister's marriage Malathi comes home and both her and husband are insulted. Malathi and her family leave home even before the wedding functions start because it gets difficult for Malathi to face the insults. Her mother gets hurt and becomes bedridden and soon dies with sadness. Her father realizes his mistakes and goes to Malathi's home and apologizes. Her father decides to stay with Malathi forever.

Cast 

Madhu as Madhavan
Sharada as Malathi (voice dubbed by K. P. A. C. Lalitha)
Sukumari
Kaviyoor Ponnamma as Malathi's mother
Adoor Bhasi
Thikkurissy Sukumaran Nair as Malathi's father
Sankaradi
Raghavan
Baby Jayarani
Junior Sheela
Kannoor Rajam
Kedamangalam Ali
Master Bablu
Master Babu
Master Sekhar
Metilda
Pala Thankam
Philomina
Ramankutty
S. P. Pillai
Sathyapalan Nair
Thodupuzha Radhakrishnan
Veeran
Vijayabhanu
Krishnankutty

Soundtrack

Accolades 
Filmfare Award for Best Film – Malayalam

References

External links 
 

1970s Malayalam-language films
1971 drama films
1971 films
Films directed by A. Vincent
Indian drama films
Malayalam remakes of Marathi films